Bayinnaung Market (also Bayintnaung Market), located in northwestern Yangon, is the largest agricultural commodities trading market in Myanmar. It is the only legally permitted wholesale center of beans and pulses in the country, which exported 1.34 million tonnes of beans and pulses in 2007 for a total value of US$750 million.

Matpe is the most common bean and pulse export at the market.

In August 2009, about 4000 tonnes of matpe, green mung, pigeon peas and chickpeas were traded daily. The market is the main wholesale center of dried fish and prawns for mainly domestic markets. The market is at the center of the planned Internet-based commodities information network that will link all of the country's wholesale commodity exchange centers, to achieve consistent pricing and operations in line with international market prices.

Myanmar's wholesale commodity exchanges are currently only connected by telephone. As of October 2008, only Banyinnaung has the system, which displays local prices for beans and pulses in real time. Domestic and international prices for edible oil crops, onions, garlic, potatoes, chili are expected to be added soon. Since August 2009, the Myanmar Pulses, Beans and Sesame Seed Merchants’ Association requires that all domestic and international transactions be concluded here at Bayinnaung Market.

References

Links
Burma Markets Information Daily; accessed December 11, 2017.

Shopping malls and markets in Myanmar
Buildings and structures in Yangon
Economy of Yangon